Daniel J "D. J." Carrasco (born April 12, 1977) is a former American professional baseball pitcher. He is currently the pitching coach of the Syracuse Mets.

Career

Baltimore Orioles
Carrasco was originally drafted by the Texas Rangers in the 39th round (1,074th overall) of the 1995 Major League Baseball draft, but did not sign. He was later drafted in the 26th round (795th overall) of the 1997 Major League Baseball draft by the Baltimore Orioles, but did not pitch a minor league game for them as he was released in 1998.

Cleveland Indians/Pittsburgh Pirates
After his release from the Orioles, Carrasco signed with the Cleveland Indians organization. He spent the 1998 season playing for the Single-A Watertown Indians of the New York–Penn League, and finished the season 1–1 with a 5.40 ERA in 13 games (one start). Carrasco later joined the Pittsburgh Pirates organization, and pitched in their farm system from 1999 through 2002.

Kansas City Royals
Carrasco was drafted by the Kansas City Royals from the Pirates in the 2002 Rule 5 draft. He made the Royals' Opening Day roster in 2003, and spent the entire season in the majors for the Royals, going 6–5 with a 4.82 ERA in 50 games (two starts). Carrasco split 2004 and 2005 between the Royals and their minor league affiliates. He saw more time in the starting rotation in 2005, posting a 6–8 record with a 4.79 ERA in 21 games (20 starts). On December 7, 2005, the Royals released Carrasco to allow him to pursue an opportunity to play in Japan.

Fukuoka SoftBank Hawks
Carrasco signed with the Fukuoka SoftBank Hawks of Nippon Professional Baseball prior to the 2006 season. He made only three starts with the team, posting an ERA of 14.81 with an 0–3 record.

Arizona Diamondbacks
On December 30, 2006, Carrasco signed with the Arizona Diamondbacks. He spent the season with their Triple-A affiliate, the Tucson Sidewinders, finishing the season 5–14 with a 6.68 ERA in 34 games (22 starts).

Chicago White Sox
On January 11, 2008, Carrasco signed a minor league contract that included an invitation to spring training with the Chicago White Sox.

On July 9, 2008, Carrasco was recalled by the White Sox to replace injured closer Bobby Jenks. Carrasco posted a 2.38 ERA in seven appearances with Triple-A Charlotte before being recalled. On August 3, 2008, during a game against the Kansas City Royals, Carrasco threw two pitches inside to Miguel Olivo, the second one hitting Olivo. Olivo came after Carrasco and started a bench-clearing brawl. On December 12, 2009, Carrasco was non-tendered by the White Sox, making him a free agent.

Pittsburgh Pirates
On January 13, 2010, Carrasco signed a major league contract with the Pittsburgh Pirates with an invite to spring training.

Arizona Diamondbacks
On July 31, 2010, Carrasco, Bobby Crosby and Ryan Church were traded to the Arizona Diamondbacks for Chris Snyder and Pedro Ciriaco.

New York Mets
On December 9, 2010, the New York Mets signed Carrasco to a two-year, $2.5 million contract. On June 11, 2011, he returned to the club as Dale Thayer was sent down. On June 16, 2011, in a game against the Atlanta Braves, Carrasco balked in the final run of the ball game in the 10th inning, giving the Braves a 9–8 victory. It was just the second balk off in the Mets history. On May 15, 2012, Carrasco was ejected by umpire Gary Darling following a hit batsmen. After surrendering a home run to Rickie Weeks of the Milwaukee Brewers, Carrasco drilled Ryan Braun with the next pitch and was thrown out. He was designated for assignment the following day. On May 25, 2012, he was released by the team.

Atlanta Braves
Carrasco signed with the Atlanta Braves on June 20, 2012. He made his first appearance for the Triple A Gwinnett Braves on June 20. On July 4, he was released by Atlanta.

Scouting report
Carrasco featured an 89–93 mile per hour four-seam fastball, a sinking two-seam fastball at 88–92 mph, a curveball and a changeup.

Unlike most pitchers, Carrasco, who typically threw with an overhand arm-slot, would occasionally drop down to a submarine arm-slot trying to catch the batter off guard.

Personal life
Carrasco attended Hayward High School in Hayward, California.

References

External links

1977 births
Living people
Altoona Curve players
American expatriate baseball players in Japan
Arizona Diamondbacks players
Baseball players from Arizona
Buffalo Bisons (minor league) players
Charlotte Knights players
Chicago White Sox players
Fukuoka SoftBank Hawks players
Gwinnett Braves players
Hickory Crawdads players
Kansas City Royals players
Lynchburg Hillcats players
Major League Baseball pitchers
New York Mets players
Omaha Royals players
People from Safford, Arizona
Pima Aztecs baseball players
Pittsburgh Pirates players
St. Lucie Mets players
Watertown Indians players
Williamsport Crosscutters players
Tiburones de La Guaira players
American expatriate baseball players in Venezuela
Tucson Sidewinders players